Nikola Todev (13 June 1928 – 30 March 1991) was a Bulgarian theater and film actor.

Todev is best known with his performances of characteristict types most notably the village mayor in The Hare Census (1973), Kara Kolyo in Manly Times (1977) and the uncle in Ladies Choice (1980).

Biography and Career

Todev was born on 13 June 1928 in  the town of Devin, Smolyan Province. He started acting on the stage of Smolyan theater in 1952. Later he moved to Pazardzhik continuing to work in the local theater.

He made his debut in the cinema in the notable film Krayat na Pesenta / The End of The Song (1971) whose screenplay  was written by  the eminent Bulgarian writer Nikolai Haitov. In 1973 Todev was already amidst the group of famous Bulgarian actors that were filmed in the remarkable screen satire Prebroyavane na Divite Zaytsi / The Hare Census. A year later he became a member of the Union of Bulgarian Filmmakers.

Known with the characteristic types he performs, Todev continued an intensive career appeared in classics as Manly Times (1977), also written by Haitov and the cult comedy Dami Kanyat / Ladies Choice (1980). In the end of the 1980s he was decorated with the high government prize the Order Of Saint Cyril And Saint Methodius.

Nikola Todev died in 1991 at the age of 63.

Filmography

References
Bulgarian National Film Archive 
Nikola Todev 
BG movies info

External links
 

Bulgarian male film actors
Bulgarian male stage actors
Bulgarian male television actors
1928 births
1991 deaths
People from Smolyan Province
20th-century Bulgarian male actors